Maesawa Dam is an earthfill dam located in Gifu Prefecture in Japan. The dam is used for irrigation. The catchment area of the dam is 4.8 km2. The dam impounds about 19  ha of land when full and can store 2025 thousand cubic meters of water. The construction of the dam was started on 1971 and completed in 1980.

References

Dams in Gifu Prefecture